Puika is a 1977 Latvian Soviet Socialist Republic film directed by Aivars Freimanis. The film received the Lielais Kristaps award for best film in 1977, the competition's inaugural year.

References

External links

Soviet-era Latvian films
Latvian children's films
1977 films